Maindhan is a 2014 Tamil-language Malaysian action comedy film directed by C. Kumaresan, who also enacted the lead role. The film also stars Shaila, Gheetha, Rabbit Mac, Hanuman and THR Uthaya. Malaysia rapper Darkey made a special appearance. The film had a limited release on 9 August 2014 in Malaysia, Singapore, and Tamil Nadu. It gained acclaim from critics and also emerged as the highest grossing locally produced Tamil film of all time before getting beaten by Vedigundu Pasangge in 2018.

Plot
After failing in his love life, Dev finds company in alcohol. In his state, he often sees an old man who gives him hints on how his day is going to turn out. One day, he accidentally bumps into a young boy from a shelter home. He realises there is an uncanny similarity between the boy and his ex-girlfriend, so he decides to get to know the boy further only to uncover something Dev didn't wish he knew in the first place.

Cast
 C. Kumaresan as Dev
 Shaila Nair as Shalini (Shalu)
 Geetha as Gayathri 
 Rabbit Mac as Vinod, Dev's best friend
 Hanuman as Arun
 Uthaya THR Raaga as Appa
 Darkey as the main antagonist 
 Sheezay as Raj

Soundtrack 
The songs were composed by Mansher Singh and Rabbit Mac.

Reception 
Malini Mannath of The New Indian Express opined that "Maindhan at the most is a promising effort from a debutant maker".

References

Tamil diaspora in Malaysia
Tamil-language Malaysian films
Malaysian action comedy films
2010s Tamil-language films
Astro Shaw films
2014 films
Films produced by Gayatri Su-Lin Pillai